Tandi Mwape (born 20 July 1996) is a Zambian footballer who plays as a defender for TP Mazembe and the Zambia national football team.

Career

Club
After multiple years spent in his native Zambia, Mwape moved to Congolese club TP Mazembe in July 2019. He made his debut for the club just days after his announcement, appearing in a 1-0 defeat to Rayon Sports at the Kagame Interclub Cup.

International
Mwape made his senior international debut on 2 June 2019 in a penalty victory over Malawi at the COSAFA Cup.

Career statistics

International

International goals
Scores and results list Zambia's goal tally first.

References

External links

 TP Mazembe Profile

1996 births
Living people
Zambian footballers
Green Eagles F.C. players
Kabwe Warriors F.C. players
TP Mazembe players
Zambia international footballers
Association football defenders
Zambia Super League players
Linafoot players
Zambian expatriate footballers
Expatriate footballers in the Democratic Republic of the Congo
Zambian expatriate sportspeople in the Democratic Republic of the Congo